= Ryan Hepworth =

English rugby league player (born 1981)

Personal information
- Full name: Ryan Hepworth
- Born: 16 January 1981 (age 44)
- Height: 6 ft 2 in (188 cm)
- Weight: 17 st 8 lb (112 kg)

Playing information
- Position: Prop
Club
Years	Team	Pld	T	G	FG	P
2007–12	Sheffield Eagles	112	12	0	0	48
2013–16	Dewsbury Rams	101	7	0	0	28
	Total	213	19	0	0	76
- Source: As of 9 June 2017

Ryan Hepworth (born 16 January 1981) is a former professional rugby league footballer who last played for the Dewsbury Rams in the RFL Championship in 2016. He played as a prop or second row.

Hepworth previously played for the Sheffield Eagles in the RFL Championship from 2007 to 2012.
